P20 may refer to:

Military 
 , a minelayer and patrol boat of the Argentine Navy
 Curtiss YP-20, a prototype fighter of the United States Army Air Service
 , a patrol vessel of the Irish Naval Service
 Lippisch P.20, a proposed World War II German fighter aircraft
 P-20 radar, a Soviet radar
 P-20, a variant of the USSR P-15 Termit missile

Other uses 
 Avi Suquilla Airport, in La Paz County, Arizona, United States
 Huawei P20, a smartphone
 Papyrus 20, a biblical manuscript
 Toyota Publica (P20), a subcompact car
 P-20, a Latvian state regional road